Hanton is a surname. Notable people with the surname include:

 Alastair Hanton (1926–2021), British banker
 Alex Hanton (1922–2011), Australian rules footballer, twin brother of Hal
 Colin Hanton (born 1938), British musician
 Hal Hanton (1922–2011), Australian rules footballer, twin brother of Alex, both died in the same month
 Karen Hanton (birth date omitted), Scottish entrepreneur

See also
 Hanton City, Rhode Island, apparently named after the local Hanton family